Andreas Delfs (born 30 August 1959) is a German conductor.  He is the music director of the Rochester Philharmonic Orchestra and conductor laureate of the Milwaukee Symphony Orchestra.

Biography
Delfs was born in Flensburg, West Germany. He began studying piano and music theory at age ten, and by age twenty was named Music Director of the Hamburg University Orchestra.  Delfs graduated from Hamburg Conservatory in 1981, and earned his Master's at Juilliard School of Music in 1984.  At Hamburg, Delfs studied under Aldo Ceccato and Christoph von Dohnanyi.   After receiving his Master's, he accepted the post of Assistant Conductor of the Pittsburgh Symphony Orchestra, then under the music directorship of Lorin Maazel.  From 1984 to 1995 he also held the position of chief conductor of the Swiss Youth Symphony Orchestra (SYSO).

Delfs was appointed Music Director and conductor of the Milwaukee Symphony Orchestra in 1997.  In 1999, he led the Orchestra on a tour of Cuba, the first by an American orchestra in more than 37 years.  In December 2006, the orchestra announced that Delfs would relinquish the music directorship of the Milwaukee Symphony after the 2008-2009 season (the Orchestra's fiftieth season), and become its Conductor Laureate.

Delfs held the post of Music Director of the St. Paul Chamber Orchestra from 2001 to 2004, and the position of Generalmusikdirektor of the Staatsoper Hannover from 1996 to 2000.  In March 2007, Delfs was named Principal Conductor of the Honolulu Symphony, with an initial contract of 3 years.  His tenure with the Honolulu Symphony ended when it went bankrupt and filed for liquidation in December 2010.

In June 2015, Delfs was appointed music director of the Temple University Symphony Orchestra at the Boyer College of Music and Dance, replacing the retired Luis Biava. In addition, he is also to serve as a professor under the school's Department of Instrumental Studies.

Delfs first guest-conducted the Rochester Philharmonic in 1994.  In January 2021, the Rochester Philharmonic named Delfs its next music director.

Discography
Beethoven: Piano Concertos Nos. 1, 3 & 4 (John O'Conor, piano; London Symphony Orchestra) 
 Beethoven: Piano Concertos Nos. 2 & 5 (John O'Conor, London Symphony Orchestra)
 Sacred Songs (Renée Fleming, Royal Philharmonic Orchestra)
 Humperdinck: Hansel and Gretel (Milwaukee Symphony Orchestra)
 Mozart/Süssmayr: Requiems (St. Paul Chamber Orchestra)
 Ervín Schulhoff: 'Concertos Alla Jazz'
 Schoeck: Violin Concerto op. 21, Penthesilea-Suite (Swiss Youth Symphony Orchestra)
 Roberto Sierra: Missa Latina "Pro Pace" (Heidi Grant Murphy, soprano; Nathaniel Webster, baritone; Milwaukee Symphony Chorus and Orchestra)

References

External links
 Andreas Delfs in conversation with Robert Levine

Living people
1959 births
German male conductors (music)
People from Flensburg
21st-century German conductors (music)
21st-century German male musicians